Cottrill's Opera House, known since 1915 as Sutton's Opera House or Sutton Theater, is a historic vaudeville and movie theater building in Thomas, Tucker County, West Virginia.

It was built in 1902 and is a rectangular brick building with a high front that appears to be four stories tall. The interior is dominated by a large auditorium with balcony seating. The building is being restored for use as a live performance theater.

It was listed on the National Register of Historic Places in 1979.

References

External links

Cottrill’s Opera House official website
Cinema Treasures: Cottrill Opera House

Theatres on the National Register of Historic Places in West Virginia
Theatres completed in 1902
Buildings and structures in Tucker County, West Virginia
National Register of Historic Places in Tucker County, West Virginia
Opera houses in West Virginia
Music venues completed in 1902
Opera houses on the National Register of Historic Places
Event venues on the National Register of Historic Places in West Virginia
1902 establishments in West Virginia